Tetsuro Nishida (西田 哲朗, born September 4, 1991 in Ibaraki, Osaka) is a Japanese former professional baseball player who is currently a staff for the Fukuoka SoftBank Hawks of Nippon Professional Baseball (NPB). He has played in NPB for the Tohoku Rakuten Golden Eagles and Hawks.

Career

Tohoku Rakuten Golden Eagles

In 2010 season, Nishida played in the Eastern League of NPB's minor leagues.

On October 15, 2011, Nishida debuted in the Pacific League against the Saitama Seibu Lions.

On September 14, 2012, Nishida recorded his first hit and RBI. In 2012 season, he played 20 games in the Pacific League.

In 2013 season, Nishida played 26 games in the Pacific League. And he was selected as the Japan Series roster in the 2013 Japan Series.

On May 10, 2014, Nishida recorded his first home run. In 2014 season, he finished the regular season in 126 games with a batting average of .250, a 7 home runs, a RBI of 41, and a 8 stolen bases.

In 2015 season, Nishida finished the regular season in 62 games with a batting average of .220, a one home runs, a RBI of 8, and a 2 stolen bases.

In 2016 season, Nishida played 11 games in the Pacific League.

In 2017 season, Nishida played 22 games in the Pacific League.

Fukuoka SoftBank Hawks
On November 14, 2017, the Tohoku Rakuten Golden Eagles traded Nishida to the Fukuoka SoftBank Hawks for Ayatsugu Yamashita.

In 2018 season, Nishida finished the regular season in 72 games with a batting average of .211, a 4 home runs, a RBI of 16, and a 3 stolen bases. In the 2018 Pacific League Climax Series against the Saitama Seibu Lions, Nishida played an active part in five games with a batting average of .583 (7 hits in 17 at bats). And he played in the 2018 Japan Series and recorded his first hit and RBI in the Japan Series.

In 2019 season, Nishida injured his left flank on April 3 and his right flank on July 26. As a result, he played only seven games.

In 2020 season, Nishida played 36 games in the Pacific League. On December 2, 2020, he become a free agent. On December 23, 2020, he announced his retirement. On December 25, 2020, he become a staff for the Hawks of NPB.

References

External links

 NPB.jp
 22 Tetsuro Nishida PLAYERS2020 - Fukuoka SoftBank Hawks Official site

1991 births
Living people
Fukuoka SoftBank Hawks players
Japanese baseball players
Nippon Professional Baseball shortstops
People from Ibaraki, Osaka
Tohoku Rakuten Golden Eagles players